Morelos Cañada is the municipal seat of Cañada Morelos Municipality in the eastern central region of the Mexican state of Puebla.

http://www.microrregiones.gob.mx/catloc/contenido.aspx?refnac=210990001

Populated places in Puebla